Luke Anthony Cowan-Dickie (born 20 June 1993) is an English professional rugby union player for Exeter Chiefs in the English Premiership. He plays primarily as a hooker but can also play prop.

Club career
Cowan-Dickie has previously been dual-registered with both the Cornish Pirates and Plymouth Albion to aid his player development.

On 19 November 2011 Cowan-Dickie made his debut for Exeter at the age of eighteen in a EPCR Challenge Cup game against Cavalieri Prato. He made his Premiership debut in 2014 and that same year was part of the side that beat Northampton Saints in the final of the Anglo-Welsh Cup. He has played more than a hundred games in the Premiership, scoring a hat-trick against Harlequins during the 2016–17 season which culminated in Exeter defeating Wasps in the final to win their first League title.

Cowan-Dickie scored the opening try of the 2020 European Rugby Champions Cup Final as Exeter defeated Racing 92 to become European champions for the first time. Exeter then defeated Wasps the following weekend to complete a League and European double.

International career

England
In 2010 Cowan-Dickie represented England under-18. He was a member of the England under-20 team that won three successive titles in the 2011, 2012 and 2013 U20 Six Nations. He was part of the squad that finished seventh at the 2012 IRB Junior World Championship and the following year scored a try against France at the 2013 IRB Junior World Championship and subsequently started in the final of that tournament as England defeated Wales to become Junior World Champions for the first time. In January 2015 Cowan-Dickie represented England A against the Ireland Wolfhounds.

Cowan-Dickie was named in the 50-man training squad for the 2015 Rugby World Cup. On 15 August 2015, Cowan-Dickie made his senior international debut against France as a second-half substitute for Rob Webber in a warm-up match for the 2015 World Cup at Twickenham. He was ultimately not selected for the tournament.

In 2016 Cowan-Dickie was part of the team that achieved the Grand Slam during the 2016 Six Nation and later that year was a member of their tour party for the successful summer tour to Australia. Later that year, he was ruled out of the November internationals with an ankle injury. A knee injury sustained in early 2017 meant Cowan-Dickie missed out on touring Argentina in the Summer, but he returned to International Rugby in 2018 as he was called up by Eddie Jones to join the Six Nations training squad. He was later selected for the three-Test tour of South Africa where he made two appearances as a replacement as England lost the series 2-1.

Cowan-Dickie scored his first international tries against Wales and Ireland in warm-up games for the 2019 Rugby World Cup. He was selected for the tournament and scored in all three pool stage games against Tonga, USA and Argentina. In the World Cup final he was a second-half substitute for Jamie George as England were defeated by South Africa to finish runners up.

After the World Cup Cowan-Dickie scored a try against Ireland in the 2020 Six Nations Championship which England went on to win. Later that year he scored a try as England beat France in the final of the Autumn Nations Cup.

British and Irish Lions
Cowan-Dickie was named in the squad for the 2021 British & Irish Lions tour to South Africa. He made his debut off the bench in the 14-56 victory over the Sigma Lions. He then went on to feature in tour matches against the Cell C Sharks and South Africa 'A'. In the Lions' match against the Stormers he scored his first try of the tour and was named Player of the Match.

Cowan-Dickie made his Lions test debut in the first Test against South Africa, scoring the only try of the game for the Lions in a 17-22 win. He also started the second test, a 27-9 loss. Cowan-Dickie was on the bench for the final test, with Welsh hooker Ken Owens taking his starting spot. The close 19-16 loss meant that South Africa won the series 2-1.

International tries

England

British & Irish Lions

Honours
England
 Six Nations Championship: 2016, 2020
 Autumn Nations Cup: 2020
 Rugby World Cup runner-up: 2019

Exeter
 European Rugby Champions Cup: 2019-2020
 Premiership: 2016-17, 2019-20 
 Anglo-Welsh Cup: 2013-14

References

External links
 
 
 Twitch Channel

1993 births
Living people
Exeter Chiefs players
Cornish rugby union players
People from Newlyn
England international rugby union players
Rugby union props
Rugby union hookers
Twitch (service) streamers
British & Irish Lions rugby union players from England